Vitelline may refer to:

Embryology
 Vitelline arteries, arteries that bring blood to the yolk sac
 Vitelline circulation, the system of blood flowing between an embryo and its yolk sac
 Vitelline cyst, a developmental defect relating to the closure of the vitelline duct
 Vitelline duct, a tube that joins the yolk sac to the midgut lumen of a human embryo
 Vitelline membrane, membrane surrounding an ovum
 Vitelline veins, veins that drain blood from the yolk sac

Birds
 Vitelline masked weaver (Ploceus vitellinus), a species of bird endemic to Africa
 Vitelline warbler (Setophaga vitellina), a songbird species found in the Cayman Islands and Honduras

See also
 Vitellin, a protein found in egg yolk
 Vitelli, a surname